is an autobahn in southwestern Germany. It is the continuation of the Luxembourgish Autoroute 1, connecting the city of Luxembourg to Trier with a total length of only 14 kilometres.

Exit list

   || Luxembourg 

 

  

|}

External links 

64
A064